Enrico Debernardi (7 December 1885 – 9 November 1972) was an Italian footballer who played as a forward. He was part of the first-ever team fielded by the Italian national team in 1910.

Biography 
In 1909, Debernardi was a member of the Torino XI that participated in the 1909 Sir Thomas Lipton Trophy, regarded by many as the first European club trophy. In the tournament, he scored a goal in a 2-1 victory over Sportfreunde Stuttgart to secure his team a third-place finish.

On 15 May 1910, Debernardi went down in history as one of the eleven footballers who played in the first game of the Italian national team, helping his nation to a 6-2 home win over France with a goal. He earned two more caps for Italy, both against Hungary and both ending in defeats.

References

1885 births
1972 deaths
Italian footballers
Italy international footballers
Association football goalkeepers
Torino F.C. players